207th Division or 207th Infantry Division may refer to:

 207th Coastal Division
 207th Division (1st Formation)(People's Republic of China), January–March 1949
 207th Division (3rd Formation)(People's Republic of China), September–December 1949
 207th Infantry Division (German Empire)
 207th Infantry Division (Wehrmacht)
 207th Rifle Division